Ahmadabad (also Romanized as Aḩmadābād) is a village in Amirabad Rural District, Muchesh District, Kamyaran County, Kurdistan Province, Iran. In 2006, its population was 42, in 10 families. The village is populated by Kurds.

References 

Towns and villages in Kamyaran County
Kurdish settlements in Kurdistan Province